Mountain Meadows may refer to:

 Mountain Meadows, Utah, most known for the massacre in 1857
 Mountain Meadows massacre, the 1857 killing of emigrants in a wagon train
 Mountain Meadows (album), a 2008 album by Elliott Brood
 Mountain Meadows Reservoir, California, United States
 Mountain Meadows, Colorado

See also
 Montane ecosystem
 Mountain Meadow (disambiguation)
 Meadow (disambiguation)
 The Meadows (disambiguation)